Mohammed Inuwa Wushishi   (1 January 1940 – 4 December 2021) was a Nigerian army lieutenant general who served as Chief of Army Staff (COAS), Nigeria from October 1981 to October 1983 during the Nigerian Second Republic.

Inuwa Wushishi was born in Wushishi, North Nigeria, and was a Nupe Muslim from Niger State.

Army career
Wushishi joined the army on 21 April 1961, and attended the Nigerian Military Training College, Kaduna, and then the Mons Officer Cadet School, Aldershot in the United Kingdom.  Kazaure Technical School. He was commissioned as a second lieutenant on 12 January 1962.
He later attended the United States War College, Carlisle, Pennsylvania.

Wushishi served as a member of the United Nations Peace Keeping force in Congo in the early 1960s.

He was appointed Deputy Commandant, Army School of Infantry in July 1975.

He served as Federal Commissioner for Industries (January 1975 – March 1976) and was a member of the Supreme Military Council from 1976 to 1978.

He was Chief of Army Staff (COAS) from October 1981 to October 1983 during the Shehu Shagari administration.

Later career
Wushishi was required to retire on 3 January 1984, after the 31 December 1983 coup in which General Muhammadu Buhari came to power.

After retirement, he entered business. He became chairman of the board of directors of UAC of Nigeria, retiring on 1 January 2010 at age 70.

He was also Chairman of the board of UPDC (property development), a director of Stanbic IBTC Bank and MTS first Wireless, and a member of the board of Acorn Petroleum.

He received the national honour of Grand Commander of the Order of the Niger.

Wushishi died on 4 December 2021 in London, at the age of 81.

References

1940 births
2021 deaths
Graduates of the Mons Officer Cadet School
Nigerian generals
Nigerian Army officers
Grand Commanders of the Order of the Niger
Chiefs of Army Staff (Nigeria)